McCraney is a surname. Notable people with the surname include:

Daniel McCraney (1834–1885), Canadian politician and lawyer
George Ewan McCraney (1868–1921), Canadian politician and lawyer
Tarell Alvin McCraney (born 1980), American playwright and actor
William McCraney (1831–1911), Canadian businessman and politician

See also
Rural Municipality of McCraney No. 282, Saskatchewan, Canada